Ulmul River may refer to:
 Ulmul, a tributary of the Aita in Covasna County, Romania
 Ulmul, a tributary of the Almaș in Neamț County, Romania
 Ulmul, a tributary of the Brad in Covasna County, Romania
 Ulmul, a tributary of the Vedița in Olt County, Romania